Talfara (also Talaphara) is a village in Rajasthan, India.

Villages in Bharatpur district